Tarun Ram Phukan (also Phookun, ; 22 January 1877 – 28 July 1939) was a prominent leader of Assam. He was popularly known as Deshbhakta.

Early life and education 
Tarun Ram Phukan was born in 1877 in a reputed family of Assam. He was educated in Cotton Collegiate School, Guwahati and Presidency College, Calcutta. Later, he moved to the Bar from Inner Temple in London. He educated as a lawyer but also served as lecturer in Earle Law College in Guwahati.

Involvement in movement against British rule 
He was a prominent member of a political organization then named Assam Association till 1920. Phookan played an important part in forming the Assam Branch of the Indian National Congress in 1921. He was elected its first President. When the Non-Cooperation Movement was started, Phookan took a leading part in it and he toured various parts of Assam carrying the message of Mahatma Gandhi. In connection with the Non-Cooperation Movement, he was sentenced to one year's rigorous imprisonment in 1921.

Phookan became the Chairman of the Reception Committee, Pandu Session of the Indian National Congress in 1926. He also served as Chairman of the Municipal Board and Local Board of Guwahati and undertook several programmes for the upliftment of the under-privileged sections of society. He established a Leper Asylum in Guwahati. He was a great orator and also a prominent writer. He served as the President of the Asam Sahitya Sabha, a premier literary organisation in Assam at its Goalpara Session in 1927. He also served as President of the Assam Chhatra Sammelan in 1928. He also bought the first bicycle and the first motor car in Guwahati.

In 1921, Assam Provincial Congress Committee was formed with its headquarters at Guwahati and Kuladhar Chaliha as its president. Phookan became the president. The reconstituted APCC elected Phookan, Gopinath Bordoloi, Bimala Prasad Chaliha, Chandranath Sarmah, Krishna Nath Sarmah and Kanak Chandra Sarmah as the members of the AICC.  This new committee initiated and invited Mahatma Gandhi to Assam in 1921 to propagate the message of non-co-operation amongst the masses. Mahatma Gandhi's visit gave tremendous impetus to the congress workers to carry out the non-cooperation movement and implement the principles of Swadeshi.

All India Congress Committee session was hosted by the APCC in 1926, at Pandu, Guwahati which was presided over by S. Srinivasa Iyengar and national leaders like Motilal Nehru, Sardar Ballav Bhai Patel, Dr.Rajendra Prasad, Madan Mohan Malaviya, Muhammad Ali, Shaukat Ali, Sarojini Naidu, S. Satyamurti, Abul Kalam Azad and others attended the session.

Honour and legacy 
The Government of Assam, in 2021, decided Phukan's death date to be observed as Desh Bhakti Divas every year.

References

External links
 Deshbhakta Tarun Ram Phukan Indoor Hall, Guwahati
 Assam Pradesh Congress Committee
 Freedom Fighters of Dhakuakhana Sub-Division 
 Among the luminaries in Assam 
 Krishna Nath Sarmah

1877 births
1939 deaths
People from Kamrup Metropolitan district
Indian National Congress politicians from Assam
Indian independence activists from Assam
Politicians from Guwahati
Assam politicians
19th-century Indian politicians
20th-century Indian politicians